Spas Koprinkov (born 2 January 1970) is a Bulgarian sports shooter. He competed in two events at the 1992 Summer Olympics.

References

External links
 

1970 births
Living people
Bulgarian male sport shooters
Olympic shooters of Bulgaria
Shooters at the 1992 Summer Olympics
Place of birth missing (living people)
20th-century Bulgarian people